B with acute (majuscule: B́, minuscule: b́) is a letter of the Latin alphabet formed by addition of the acute accent over the letter B. It is used in Ntcham and Shinasha, and Võro. It also used to be used in Upper Sorbian, Lower Sorbian and Polish.

Usage 
The letter used to appear in Upper Sorbian and Lower Sorbian languages, where it represented palatalizated voiced bilabial plosive ([bʲ]). It was replaced by the digraph Bj.

It also appeared in the 16th century alphabet made by Jan Kochanowski for Polish language. In that alphabet, the letter represented palatalizated voiced bilabial plosive ([bʲ]).

References

Latin letters with diacritics
Polish letters with diacritics